Hamad Al-Rubaie (born July 1, 1981), is a Saudi Arabian professional footballer who plays as a midfielder .

Personal life
Hamad is the brother of the players Saeed Al-Rubaie, Abdullah Al-Rubaie and the cousin of the players Mohammed Al Rubaie and Masoud Al-Rubaie.

External links 
 

Living people
1981 births
People from Najran
Saudi Arabian footballers
Najran SC players
Al-Okhdood Club players
Al-Sahel SC (Saudi Arabia) players
Mudhar Club players
Saudi First Division League players
Saudi Professional League players
Saudi Second Division players
Saudi Fourth Division players
Saudi Third Division players
Association football midfielders